Wyoming is a 1940 Western film directed by Richard Thorpe and starring Wallace Beery. It was the first of seven films pairing Beery and character actress Marjorie Main.

Cast

See also
The other six Wallace Beery and Marjorie Main films:
 Barnacle Bill (1941)
 Jackass Mail (1942)
 The Bugle Sounds (1942)
 Rationing (1944)
 Bad Bascomb (1946)
 Big Jack (1949)

References

External links
 
 Wyoming at the Internet Movie Database

1940 films
American black-and-white films
1940s English-language films
Metro-Goldwyn-Mayer films
1940 Western (genre) films
Films directed by Richard Thorpe
American Western (genre) films
Cultural depictions of George Armstrong Custer
1940s American films